Oru Yamandan Premakadha is a 2019 Indian Malayalam-language comedy-drama film directed by B. C. Noufal and written by Bibin George and Vishnu Unnikrishnan. It stars Dulquer Salmaan, Nikhila Vimal, Soubin Shahir, Vishnu Unnikrishnan  Salim Kumar and Bibin George in the lead roles. The film's production began on 3 July 2017 and was completely shot in Kochi. It was released on 25 April 2019.

Plot

Set in Kadamakkudy, the film revolves around Lallu, a privileged daily wage painter and his colorful gang of friends. Although he comes from an aristocratic family and is the son of Kombanaayil John, a respected criminal lawyer in the area, he prefers the company of his under-privileged friends Panchikuttan, Vicky Peedika, and Teny Sebastian. Lallu, although uneducated, has a lot of charm. Though he is adamant that he will marry for love, and is looking to find a 'spark' in a girl, and hence has not found any girl to settle down with though Jesna is attracted to him and wishes that he marries her. However, his younger brother, a well-to-do computer engineer, wants to marry his girlfriend, whose parents insist that Lallu be married first. After trying and failing to find a girl that has the 'spark' he is looking for, Lallu sees a picture of a young woman, Diya, in the newspaper, who has gone missing, and suddenly feels the 'spark'. He and his friends try to find Diya, learning about her kind nature in the process, yet cannot find her. However, one day Jesna meets with Lallu and invites him to her wedding which was fixed by her parents. She clarifies that she is willing to wait until he gets that "spark" but her parents is unable to do so.

Lallu pieces together clues he gets from the accident Diya was involved in, and in the meantime learns that she is dead. He figures out that she was deliberately murdered by Davis, an intoxicated youth who has psychological problems from his childhood that he takes out on anyone who mentions his mother. After getting his revenge, Lallu, with the help of his father, makes them stand before the legal system, ensuring Diya gets justice in the end. The film ends by showing that although Lallu believes he has never met Diya, he actually has on several occasions. When a small girl asks his full name, Lallu reveals that his name is Mohanlal John Kombanaayil and then she mentions that he looks like actor Mammooty's son (Dulquer Salman's father is Mammoty)

Cast

 Dulquer Salman as Lallu aka Mohanlal John Kombanaayil
 Nikhila Vimal as Diya Francis
 Samyuktha as Jesna Johny
 Soubin Shahir as Vickey Paedika
 Vishnu Unnikrishnan as Teny Sebastian
 Salim Kumar as Paanchikuttan
 Bibin George as Davis
 Renji Panicker as Adv. John Kombanaayil, Lallu's and Paappi's father
 Arun Kurian as Paappi John Kombanaayil 
 Viji Ratheesh as Lallu's and Paappi's mother
 Dharmajan Bolgatty as Tinku
 Hareesh Kanaran as Frederick 
 Dileesh Pothan  as SI Abhilash Karikkan
 Suraj Venjaramoodu as Francis, Diya's father
 Lena as Annamma, Diya's mother
 Baiju as S.I Pavan Kalyan
 Sunil Sukhada as Fr. Nettooran
 Ashokan as Kushumban Johny, Jesna's father
 Pradeep Kottayam as Sebastian, Teny's father
 Resmi Anil as Teny's mother
 Chembil Ashokan as Vickey's father
 Seema G. Nair as Vickey's mother
 Molly Kannamally as Vaavathathi
 Madhu as Lallu's and Paappi's grandfather (cameo appearance)
 Janardhanan as Davis's Grandfather (cameo appearance)
 Akshara Kishor as Sandra aka Kunjumani 
 Navaneeth Saju as Younger Lallu
 Govind Motte as Younger Vickey Paedika
 Karthik Vishnu as Younger Teny Sebastian
 Ponnamma Babu as College Principal
 Reshmi Boban as Dr. Susan
 Manju Vijeesh as Deepa
 Kalabhavan Prajod as Police Constable
 Rajesh Paravoor as Police Constable
 Blessy Kurien as College Student 
 Remya Panickar as College Student
 Sivakami as Diya's friend

Music 
The music for Oru Yamandan Premakadha was composed by Nadirshah.

Release
The film was released on 25 April 2019.

Reception
The film received mixed to positive reviews and was a commercial success at box office.
Deepa Soman of The Times of India rated the movie 3 out of 5 stating: "The premise in itself might not be new, but the makers have managed to keep it quite entertaining." Deepa also praised Dulquer Salmaan's performance and wrote that it "is an out-and-out DQ show." Sify rated it 3 out of 5 stars and gave the verdict: "A suave Dulquer Salmaan saves the film." The reviewer concluded that "Oru Yamandan Premakadha is one of those films which is meant to be enjoyed without thinking too much." Cris of The News Minute gave the film a 2 out of 5 rating and wrote: "Dulquer's mass entertainer has a poor storyline." Navamy Sudhish of The Hindu said that it was "a bland treat with feel-good factors." Anna M. M. Vetticad of Firstpost rated the movie 1.5 out of 5 and concluded: "DQ looks good in lungis and is charming of course, but even his charm cannot hold up nearly three hours of exhausting wanderings." Manoj Kumar R. of The Indian Express rated it 1.5 out of 5 stars and said that "Dulquer Salmaan cannot charm his way out of this mess."

References

External links
 

2010s Malayalam-language films
Indian comedy films
Films shot in Kochi